The Journal of Biochemistry is a peer-reviewed scientific journal that covers research on biochemistry, molecular biology, cell biology, and biotechnology. It was established in 1922 and is published by Oxford University Press on behalf of the Japanese Biochemical Society. The editor-in-chief is Kohei Miyazono (Tokyo University). According to the Journal Citation Reports, the journal has a 2020 impact factor of 3.387.

Article types 
The Journal of Biochemistry publishes Regular Papers (original scientific work), Rapid Communications (complete, yet brief, accounts of work), and Reviews (short reviews solicited by the editorial board).

References

External links
 
 Japanese Biochemical Society

Publications established in 1922
Biochemistry journals
English-language journals
Monthly journals
Oxford University Press academic journals